Gerrit bij de Leij (born 9 December 1980, in Appelscha, Friesland) is an internationally notable Dutch amateur snooker player.

Bij de Leij reached the round of 32 at the 2006 IBSF World Championships in Amman, Jordan, where he was eliminated by Daniel Ward 5–2.

Career finals

Amateur finals: 6 (2 titles)

References

Sources
Gerrit bij de Leij at European Billiards & Snooker Association official site
Dutch NK Final Roy Stolk v Gerrit bij de Leij

1980 births
Living people
Dutch snooker players
People from Ooststellingwerf
Sportspeople from Friesland
21st-century Dutch people